Leporinus guttatus is a species of Leporinus found in the upper Rio Curuá, of the Rio Xingu basin of Serra do Cachimbo, Brazil in South America. This species can reach a length of  SL.

References

Taxa named by José Luis Olivan Birindelli
Taxa named by Heraldo Antonio Britski
Fish described in 2009
Anostomidae
Freshwater fish of Brazil